Gerardo Martínez (born 3 August 1969) is a Mexican former professional tennis player.

Biography
Martínez, who was born in Mexico City, turned professional in 1991 and specialised in doubles. 

A right-handed player, Martínez reached a best doubles ranking of 151 in the world, with his best ATP Tour performance a quarter-final appearance at the Athens Open in 1991.

He won a silver medal for Mexico at the 1991 Pan American Games, partnering Oliver Fernández in the men's doubles.

References

External links
 
 

1969 births
Living people
Mexican male tennis players
Pan American Games medalists in tennis
Pan American Games silver medalists for Mexico
Tennis players at the 1991 Pan American Games
Tennis players from Mexico City
Medalists at the 1991 Pan American Games